The Great Reno Balloon Race (GRBR) is a hot-air balloon race held annually in September at Reno, Nevada. The event is held at the Rancho San Rafael Park, west of the University of Nevada, Reno. The event is free to the public and completed its 35th year in 2016. Part of the mission statement of the race is to celebrate the joy of flight. The Coordination of the race is handled by two bodies. The Great Reno Balloon Race is staffed by paid workers to handle the operations at the event.

The Great Reno Balloon Race is the largest free hot-air ballooning event in the country, and is held the first weekend after Labor Day each September at Rancho San Rafael Regional Park in Reno, Nevada. The GRBR draws in a crowd of 140,000 on average each year, making it the largest free event in Northern Nevada.  The race draws entrants from throughout the United States as well as numerous other countries.

History                                                        
The first Balloon Race was in 1982, with 20 balloons. Today, upwards of 100 balloons participate each year. An event that was first started to create a tourist attraction between the Nevada State Fair and the Reno Air Races has become the icon of the community. Bringing people from all over together who share a love for family, community and ballooning, The Great Reno Balloon Race has become a beloved tradition that is embraced by locals and tourists alike.

One of the most spectacular shows over the three-day event is the Great Reno Balloon Race is Dawn Patrol. The term was patented by the board of trustees when Federal Aviation officials approved predawn flying regulations in 1978. Safety precautions such as special navigation lights became the status quo, and The Great Reno Balloon Race quickly became a national role model for pre-dawn events in 1990 when it began launching balloons before sunrise. During Dawn Patrol, pilots face unstable, pre-dawn, air conditions. The Dawn Patrol marks the beginning of the Balloon Race.

After eight years of the Dawn Patrol, yet another attraction was added. Just before Dawn Patrol, pilots light their lanterns for the Glow Show. The balloons take on an almost fictional appearance, not unlike a paper lantern which marks the beginning of the Balloon Race.

Due to the COVID-19 pandemic, the 39th edition, scheduled for 2020, was deferred to 2021.

Competition and results

The Hare and Hound Competition 
The three-day event begins with the Hare and Hound Competition, a ballooning event in which two balloons act as the "hares" while the 100 or so other balloons follow the leaders as the "hounds." Modeled after the traditional English sport of freeing a rabbit, giving it a head-start, then releasing a pack of canines to hunt it down, the ballooning competition is less dire for the hare.

The E.L. Cord Tissue Paper Hot Air Balloon Launch
The Great Reno Balloon Race Tissue Paper Balloon Launch, a Washoe County School District and Balloon Race tradition since 1999. On Thursday and Friday of the Balloon Race, over 1,000 students release their colorful, hand-made, model hot air balloons off Bunsen burners.

Balloon Blackjack
Another popular event at The Great Reno Balloon Races is Balloon Blackjack. This event, implemented at the Balloon Race in 1999, gives the pilots a taste of the Reno gaming experience in an airborne blackjack tournament. The pilots compete for prizes such as complimentary weekends and meals at many of the area's best casinos.

The World's Largest Pajama Party-Pajama Fest 
The Balloon Race's newest event and one of its most notable is The World's Largest Pajama Party. Pajama Fest invites the entire community to participate by attending The Great Reno Balloon Race in pajamas. As well to wearing pajamas, participants are encouraged to show off their best ‘bedhead’ during the Bed Head competition. Rolling out of bed is hardly a bad thing at the World's Largest Pajama Party where spectators of all ages are encouraged to leave their PJs on for what the coziest party of the year is quite possibly.

Volunteers

Each year The Great Reno Balloon Race volunteers, or Aeronauts, come together to help make the event possible. The Aeronauts consists of about 100 people providing help in many areas of the race including field set-up, pilot crewing, and upkeep of the grounds. They also assist everyone involved in the race from the organizers and pilots to the sponsors and spectators. The volunteer group meets monthly and works in shifts during the actual event.

See also
 Hot air balloon festivals

External links
 - www.renoballoon.com
 2008 Great Reno Balloon Race Gallery
 2007 Great Reno Balloon Race Gallery
 YouTube - Reno Balloon Race 2006
 Great Reno Balloon Race Photographs

Hot air balloon festivals in the United States
Festivals in Nevada
Sports in Reno, Nevada
Recurring sporting events established in 1982
1982 establishments in Nevada